Ochoco Dam is a dam in Central Oregon,  east of Prineville in Crook County, Oregon, in the United States.

The dam impounds Ochoco Creek to create Ochoco Reservoir.  No hydroelectric power is generated here.  The reservoir holds  of water for irrigation and flood control, and is also used for fishing and boating.  The former Ochoco Lake State Park, with its 22 campsites and lake access, has been re-designated as a county park, and is now run by the Crook County Parks and Recreation District.

Chronic leaking through its middle section posed a constant threat to the city of Prineville, close downstream, so the dam was replaced by the United States Bureau of Reclamation in 1949. In the mid 1990s the reservoir was drained twice for additional safety retrofitting. Although the Bureau of Reclamation has been involved in much of the work here, title to the dam is held by the Ochoco Irrigation District.

In 1999, the dam was the subject of an April Fool's hoax from radio station KSJJ, a hoax that the magazine Time listed among its '"Top 10 Shocking Hoaxes"', along with the balloon boy hoax, 1938 The War of the Worlds radio hoax, and the 2010 Georgian news report hoax.

See also

List of lakes in Oregon

References 

Dams in Oregon
Reservoirs in Oregon
United States local public utility dams
Landforms of Crook County, Oregon
Buildings and structures in Crook County, Oregon
Dams completed in 1920
1920 establishments in Oregon